Peter William Jenkins (April 30, 1944 – October 2021) was a Canadian politician, who served as deputy premier and health minister in the territorial government of the Yukon, and as mayor of Dawson City.

Biography

Jenkins, a hotelier, first ran for the territorial legislature in 1989, but lost to NDP cabinet minister Art Webster. Jenkins' campaign manager at that time was future Liberal Premier Pat Duncan.

Prior to entering provincial politics, he served as mayor of Dawson City from 1980 to 1994, earning the nickname "Pirate Pete" after he registered for satellite television service under the name of a dead local pioneer and then redistributed the television signals to residents of Dawson City for free.

Jenkins was first elected to the Yukon Legislative Assembly in the 1996 election in Klondike for the Yukon Party. He defended his seat in the 2000 election, the only Yukon Party member to do so. He assumed the leadership of the party after the election. He held the position as sole MLA and leader until May and June 2002, when Dennis Fentie crossed the floor from the NDP and won the party's leadership, defeating Jenkins and former party president Darcy Tkachuk.

Jenkins defended his seat successfully in the 2002 general election and was sworn into cabinet in November, serving as Health Minister and Deputy Premier until November 28, 2005 when he resigned from the party and cabinet. Jenkins said this was because "the heart and soul of my community has been ripped out by the inefficiences of government at the municipal level, the territorial level." Fentie told the press at the time it was due to the ongoing loans file, which involved Jenkins owing $300,000 to the territorial government, in which he served as minister. This eventually was cleared off the books in March 2006.

Jenkins sat as an Independent MLA in the Assembly until dissolution, and chose not to run in the 2006 general election. Jenkins later ran for another term as mayor of Dawson City in the 2009 municipal election, defeating incumbent John Steins by seven votes. He was defeated in the 2012 municipal election by Wayne Potoroka.

At the age of 77, Jenkins died from COVID-19 at a hospital in Vancouver, British Columbia, in October 2021 during the COVID-19 pandemic in British Columbia.

Electoral record

Yukon general election, 2002

|-

 
| style="width: 130px" |Liberal
| Glen Everitt
|align="right"| 224
|align="right"| 22.9%
|align="right"| -14.0%
|-

|NDP
| Lisa Hutton
|align="right"| 200
|align="right"| 21.3%
|align="right"| -1.9%
|- bgcolor="white"
!align="left" colspan=3|Total
!align="right"| 937
!align="right"| 100.0%
!align="right"| –

Yukon general election, 2000

|-

|-
 
| style="width: 130px" |Liberal
| Stuart Schmidt
|align="right"| 397
|align="right"| 36.9%
|align="right"| +28.2%
|-

|NDP
| Aedes Scheer
|align="right"| 249
|align="right"| 23.2%
|align="right"| -10.7%
|-
|- bgcolor="white"
!align="left" colspan=3|Total
!align="right"| 1,075
!align="right"| 100.0%
!align="right"| –

Yukon general election, 1996

|-

|-

|NDP
| Tim Gerberding
|align="right"| 372
|align="right"| 33.9%
|align="right"| -12.0%
|-
 
| style="width: 130px" |Liberal
| Glen Everitt
|align="right"| 96
|align="right"| 8.8%
|align="right"| +8.8%
|-

| style="width: 130px" |Independent
| John Cramp
|align="right"| 21
|align="right"| 1.9%
|align="right"| +1.9%
|-
|- bgcolor="white"
!align="left" colspan=3|Total
!align="right"| 1,099
!align="right"| 100.0%
!align="right"| –

References

External links
 Yukon Legislative Assembly Website - Biography of Peter Jenkins

1944 births
2021 deaths
Anglophone Quebec people
Independent MLAs in Yukon
Mayors of Dawson City
Politicians from Montreal
Yukon Party MLAs
Yukon political party leaders
Deaths from the COVID-19 pandemic in Canada